Danilo Marques (born December 26, 1985) is a Brazilian mixed martial artist who competes in the Heavyweight division. He competed for the Ultimate Fighting Championship (UFC) and now is competing for the Professional Fighters League (PFL).

Background
Marques started doing taekwondo for fun when he was  10 years old, and around the age of 13, he started in boxing. He started competing at an amateur level, and it became his main activity for many years. Later, at around 18, he started with BJJ, due to his desire to become a more complete fighter, and through my boxing trainer, Ivan “Pitu” de Oliveira (who trains Demian Maia, Shogun Rua and others). he started training some MMA around eight years ago.

Mixed martial arts career

Early career
Starting his professional career in 2014, Marques compiled a 9–2 record fighting on the Brazilian regional scene, winning the GCF Middleweight Championship in this process. Marques's lone bout outside of Brazil came on April 14, 2017 at LFA 9, where he faced Myron Dennis, losing the close bout via split decision.

Ultimate Fighting Championship
In his UFC debut, Marques faced Khadis Ibragimov on September 27, 2020 at UFC 253. He won the fight via unanimous decision.

Marques faced Mike Rodríguez on February 6, 2021 at UFC Fight Night: Overeem vs. Volkov. He won the fight via rear-naked choke in round two.

Marques was expected to face Ed Herman on June 26, 2021 at UFC Fight Night: Gane vs. Volkov. However, Herman was removed from the card due to undisclosed reasons on June 14 and replaced by Kennedy Nzechukwu. Marques controlled the first two rounds with his grappling, but ultimately lost the fight via TKO in round three.

Marques was scheduled to face Jailton Almeida on November 13, 2021 at UFC Fight Night 197. However Danilo required surgery so the bout was rescheduled for February 5, 2022 at UFC Fight Night 200. Marques lost the fight via technical knockout in round one.

On February 23, 2022, it was announced that Marques was no longer part of the UFC roster.

Post UFC 
After picking up a triangle choke submission victory against Brock McKinney at Gladiator Challenge: Backyard Brawl, Marques moved up to Heavyweight and competed at PFL Challenger Series 11 on February 10, 2023 against Ras Hylton. He won the fight via a rear-naked choke submission.

Championships and accomplishments

Mixed martial arts 

 Gladiator Combat Fight
 GCF Vacant Middleweight Championship (One time)

Mixed martial arts record

|-
|Win
|align=center|13–4
|Ras Hylton
|Submission (rear-naked choke)
|PFL Challenger Series 11
| 
|align=center|2
|align=center|2:33
|Orlando, Florida, United States
|
|-
|Win
|align=center|12–4
|Brock McKinney
|Submission (triangle choke)
|Gladiator Challenge: Backyard Brawl
| 
|align=center|1
|align=center|1:23
|Valley Center, California, United States
|
|-
|Loss
|align=center|11–4
|Jailton Almeida
|TKO (punches)
|UFC Fight Night: Hermansson vs. Strickland
| 
|align=center|1
|align=center|2:57
|Las Vegas, Nevada, United States
|
|-
|Loss
|align=center|11–3
|Kennedy Nzechukwu
|TKO (punches)
|UFC Fight Night: Gane vs. Volkov
|
|align=center|3
|align=center|0:20
|Las Vegas, Nevada, United States
|
|-
| Win
| align=center| 11–2
|Mike Rodríguez
|Technical Submission (rear-naked choke)
|UFC Fight Night: Overeem vs. Volkov
|
|align=center|2
|align=center|4:52
|Las Vegas, Nevada, United States
|
|-
| Win
| align=center| 10–2
|Khadis Ibragimov
|Decision (unanimous)
|UFC 253
|
|align=center|3
|align=center|5:00
|Abu Dhabi, United Arab Emirates
|
|-
| Win
| align=center|9–2
| Cleiton Caetano
| Decision (unanimous)
| Gladiator Combat Fight 33
| 
| align=center| 3
| align=center| 5:00
| Curitiba, Brazil
| 
|-
| Win
| align=center|8–2
| Marck Polimeno
| Submission (armbar)
|Gladiator Combat Fight 31
|
| align=center| 1
| align=center| N/A
|Curitiba, Brazil
|
|-
| Loss
| align=center|7–2
| Myron Dennis
| Decision (split)
| LFA 9
| 
| align=center| 3
| align=center| 5:00
| Shawnee, Oklahoma, United States
|
|-
| Win
| align=center| 7–1
| Junior Lourenço
| Submission (rear-naked choke)
| Curitiba Top Fight 10
|
| align=center| 2
| align=center| 4:42
| Curitiba, Brazil
|
|-
| Loss
| align=center|6–1
| Márcio Teles
|KO (punch)
|Thunder Fight 8
|
|align=center| 1
|align=center| 1:44
|São Paulo, Brazil
|
|-
| Win
| align=center| 6–0
|Alisson Jorge
|TKO (kick to the body and punches)
|Shogun Team: Fight Day 1
|
|align=center|1
|align=center|1:43
|Curitiba, Brazil
|
|-
| Win
| align=center| 5–0
|Marco Antonio Camargo
| TKO (punches)
| Predador FC 29
|
| align=center| 1
| align=center| 4:25
| São José do Rio Preto, Brazil
| 
|-
| Win
| align=center| 4–0
| Willian Elias Soares
|TKO (submission to punches)
|Predador FC 28
|
|align=center|1
|align=center|4:00
|São José do Rio Preto, Brazil
|
|-
| Win
| align=center|3–0
| Glauco Florencio
|Submission
|Evocke Fight: Gods Of War
|
| align=center|1
| align=center|1:00
|Osasco, Brazil
|
|-
| Win
| align=center| 2–0
| Alex Junius
| Submission (rear-naked choke)
|Omega Challenger 1
|
| align=center|1
| align=center|1:40
|São Paulo, Brazil
|
|-
| Win
| align=center|1–0
| Matheus de Oliveira
| TKO (punches)
|Predador FC 26
|
|align=center|1
|align=center|2:02
|São José do Rio Preto, Brazil
|

See also 
 List of male mixed martial artists

References

External links 
  
  

Living people
Light heavyweight mixed martial artists
Mixed martial artists utilizing taekwondo
Mixed martial artists utilizing boxing
Mixed martial artists utilizing Brazilian jiu-jitsu
1985 births
Sportspeople from São Paulo
Brazilian male mixed martial artists
Ultimate Fighting Championship male fighters
Brazilian male taekwondo practitioners
Brazilian male boxers
Brazilian practitioners of Brazilian jiu-jitsu